Pohorabawa is a village in the Ratnapura District in the Sabaragamuwa Province of Sri Lanka.  It is divided into Ihala Pohorabawa and Pahala Pohorabawa.  The village has a school, a post office, and a rural bank.

Populated places in Sabaragamuwa Province
Populated places in Ratnapura District